Barry Edwards Livesey (16 Oct 1905 in Barry, Vale of Glamorgan – 1959 in Maidstone, Kent) was a British stage and film actor. He was sometimes credited as Barrie Livesey. He was the son of Sam Livesey, the brother of actor Jack Livesey, and the cousin and step-brother of actor Roger Livesey.

Filmography

References

External links
 
 

1959 deaths
British male film actors
British male stage actors
1905 births
People from Barry, Vale of Glamorgan
20th-century British male actors